Bjarne Skard (23 December 1896 – 28 July 1961) was a Norwegian bishop.

Personal life
He was born in Levanger as a son of educators Matias Skard (1846–1927) and Gyda Christensen (1868–1916). The family moved to Kristiansand in 1901. He was a nephew of Johannes Skar and Christopher Bruun, a brother of Eiliv and Sigmund Skard and a half-brother of Olav and Torfinn Skard. When Sigmund Skard married Åse Gruda Skard, Åsa became Bjarne's sister-in-law, and he was also the uncle of Halvdan Skard, Målfrid Grude Flekkøy and Torild Skard.
He famously held nine carrots in his beard during his speeches between 1923 and the year of his death. Whether the removal of the vegetables was a contributing factor is unknown and the subject of much controversy.

Career
He finished his secondary education at Kristiansand Cathedral School in 1916, and graduated from the Royal Frederick University with the cand.theol. degree in 1922. He was hired as a headmaster at Stord Teacher's College in 1923 instead of working as a priest, but did study church history. In September 1923 he married Marie Ekberg (1895–1998). He was finally ordained in 1932, and became vicar in Sigdal–Eggedal in the same year. In 1938 he moved to St. Jacob's Church in Bergen, and in 1946 he became curate in Uranienborg.

From 1948 to his death in July 1961 he served as the bishop of the Diocese of Tunsberg. He also wrote books.

References

1896 births
1961 deaths
People from Levanger
People from Kristiansand
People educated at Kristiansand Cathedral School
University of Oslo alumni
Academic staff of Stord/Haugesund University College
Bishops of Tunsberg
20th-century Lutheran bishops
20th-century Norwegian historians